The Israeli mafia (or , , "organized crime in Israel") are the organized crime groups operating in Israel or consisting of Israeli members. There are 16 crime families operating in Israel, five major groups active on the national level and 11 smaller organizations. There are six Jewish crime families active and three Arab crime families. Many heads and members of the crime groups have either been killed or are in prison.

Organized crime in Israel
The major crime groups are the Abergils, the Abutbuls, the Alperons, the Dumranis, the Shirazis, the Amir Molnar and the Zeev Rosenstein syndicates. The illegal activities they are engaged in include operating casinos and other forms of gambling inside and outside Israel, car theft, prostitution, human trafficking, money laundering, murder, protection and extortion rackets, loan sharking and drug dealing.

According to Israel's former Police Commissioner David Cohen, Israeli crime organizations had penetrated the formal economic sector and local governments, and "equipped themselves with large quantities of combat means explosives and arms." In a mob war starting in the early 2000s between the crime families, several crime bosses were killed. It also cost the lives of innocent bystanders.
The Iakhbal is the Israeli Special Police Unit that fights organized crime.

In Israeli politics 

In 2010, it was reported by Wikileaks that the United States Embassy in Israel expressed grave concern that Inbal Gavrieli, the niece of one of Israel's most powerful mob bosses, had been elected to the Knesset as an MK for the Likud party. Inbal Gavrieli's subsequent attempt to use her parliamentary immunity to prevent her father's house from being searched by the Israel Police during an investigation into illegal gambling and tax evasion further compounded the concerns raised by the United States Ambassador to Israel regarding the influence of organized crime in the Likud central committee. Her father, Ezra "Shuni" Gavrieli, is suspected of being a ranking member of the crime family as he had previously been convicted of racketeering related offenses, as had her brother; in 2009 her cousin was murdered in what is suspected to have been a gangland slaying.

North-African and Middle Eastern crime families
The immigration of Egyptian and Moroccan Jews to Israel and their settlement in the more impoverished neighborhoods led to the creation of crime families among Maghrebi Jews. This is evident in the fact that a large number of Israeli organized criminals have fled to Morocco in recent years. Israeli crime families of Moroccan Jewish descent expanded their operations to Europe and the US, especially with their involvement in drug trafficking. Some of Israel's more well-known crime families are of North African and Middle Eastern Jewish descent: the Abergil crime family as well as the Abutbul and Domrani clans are originally from Morocco, the Alperon clan came from Egypt, and the Shirazi clan from Iran.

Israeli Arab organized crime
Israeli-Arab organized crime groups were formed in Israel. Some Arab-majority cities and towns are home to local crime families. Clans like Tayibe based Abdel-Kader family are involved in extortion, drug and weapon trafficking, fraud as well as money laundering, often in cooperation with their Jewish counterparts. One Arab crime family, the Jarushi family from Ramla, is one of the most powerful crime families in Israel. The Qarajah crime family, also originated from Ramla, was used to have a long time blood feud with the Jarushis, resulting in the death of 24 people in the 1990. The feud ended when the Qarajahs were forced by the government to have a cease fire agreement whereby they will leave Ramla to settle in any other Arab settlement. After no other settlement agreed to house them, the government eventually settled them in the Jewish town Harish.

Another example was the criminal gang around Moussa Aliyan in New York City whose main business was the importation of heroin.

Russian mafia 
The Russian mafia in Israel began with the mass immigration of Russian Jews to Israel in 1989. Jewish Russian crime bosses such as Semion Mogilevich acquired Israeli citizenship and laundered money through Israel.

The Russian mafia saw Israel as an ideal place to launder money, as Israel's banking system was designed to encourage aliyah, the immigration of Jews, and the accompanying capital. Following the trend of global financial deregulation, Israel had also implemented legislation aimed at easing the movement of capital. Combined with the lack of anti-money laundering legislation, Russian organised crime found it an easy place to transfer ill-gotten gains. In 2005, police estimated that Russian organised crime had laundered between $5 and 10 billion in the fifteen years since the end of the Soviet Union. Non-Jewish criminals such as Sergei Mikhailov sought to get Israeli passports, using fake Jewish documentation.

Russian and Ukrainian Jewish criminals have also been able to set up networks in the United States, following the large migration of Russian Jews to New York City and Miami, but also in European cities such as Berlin and Antwerp. Russian-Jewish mobsters include Marat Balagula, Evsei Agron and their respective criminal gangs in the United States. Soviet-Jewish criminal groups in the United States are involved in racketeering, prostitution, drug trafficking, extortion, and gasoline tax fraud as well as murder.

Georgian organized crime
Family-based organized crime groups were formed among Georgian Jewish immigrants to Israel as well. Georgian-Jewish crime families have been able to expand their operations to Western European cities such as Antwerp. They are involved in counterfeiting, fraud, money laundering, drug trafficking, weapon trafficking, prostitution and armed robbery. Such was the case with the Georgian-Jewish Melikhov clan in Antwerp.

In the United States
In the 1980s Israelis set up a crime syndicate headed by Johnny Attias in New York, dubbed the "Israeli mafia". It pulled off the biggest gold heist in the history of Manhattan's jewelry district, getting away with over $4 million in gold jewelry. Attias was murdered in January 1990, and New York's Israeli mafia fell apart soon after. Several members, among them Ron Gonen, had turned informant and the authorities arrested the rest of the gang in September of that year.

Israeli crime organizations such as the Abergil crime family and Zeev Rosenstein were heavily involved in ecstasy trafficking in the United States. In a statement before Congress in 2000, officials with the U.S. Customs Service noted that "Israeli organized-crime elements appear to be in control" of the multibillion-dollar U.S. ecstasy trade, "from production through the international smuggling phase". The main drug supplier of former Gambino crime family underboss Sammy Gravano in his Arizona drug ring allegedly was New York based Israeli mobster Ilan Zarger, who allegedly distributed more than one million ecstasy pills from May 1999 to May 2000 with a wholesale value of $7 million. He pleaded guilty to charges of running a drug gang that flooded Arizona and New York with almost four million ecstasy pills over three years. Another Israeli, Oded Tuito, said to head one of the largest ecstasy-smuggling organization, which imported millions of ecstasy pills from Paris, Brussels and Frankfurt into New York, Miami and Los Angeles, was arrested in May 2001.

In 2006 Zeev Rosenstein was extradited to the U.S., after being arrested in Israel. He pleaded guilty before a federal court in Florida to charges that he distributed ecstasy pills and was sentenced to 12 years in prison which he serves in Israel. In January 2011, Itzik Abergil and Meir Abergil and three other suspects were extradited to the U.S.

They faced a 77-page, 32-count federal indictment that alleged murder, massive embezzlement, money laundering, racketeering and running a large Los Angeles-based ecstasy ring.

In Mexico
The Israeli mafia killed Israeli citizens in broad daylight at a restaurant in a shopping mall in Mexico City on July 24, 2019. A 33-year-old woman, who was reportedly paid MXN$5,000 (US$260), was arrested. Her alleged accomplice was arrested in Cancun, Quintana Roo, Mexico, on July 26.

Notable members 
 Abergil Crime Family - Top Moroccan Jewish criminal organization in Israel, involved mostly in drug trafficking and illegal gambling.
 Yaakov Alperon - Head of the Egyptian Jewish Alperon Crime Family, until his car bombing assassination on November 17, 2008.
 Ludwig Fainberg - He was a crime figure in America with connections to the Medellin Cartel and the Russian mafia, until he was arrested.
 Zeev Rosenstein - Formerly the top crime figure in Tel-Aviv, until he was caught. He was heavily involved in drug trafficking, mostly ecstasy, and allegedly ran other criminal operations as well.

See also 
 Crime in Israel
 Georgian mafia
 Jewish-American organized crime
 Moroccan mafia
 Romanian mafia

References

External links 

Mafia
Organized crime by ethnic or national origin
Transnational organized crime
Organised crime groups in Belgium
Organised crime groups in India
Organised crime groups in Israel
Organized crime groups in Mexico
Organised crime groups in South Africa
Organized crime groups in the United States
Gangs in Florida
Gangs in Los Angeles
Gangs in New York City
Arab-Australian culture